Crystal Bay is the name of:

 Crystal Bay (Lake Superior), a bay in Minnesota
 Crystal Bay, Minnesota
 Crystal Bay Township, Lake County, Minnesota
 Crystal Bay, Nevada